You Don't Have to Go may refer to:

You Don't Have To Go, live album by Barbara Lynn (Ichiban) 1993
"You Don't Have to Go", song by Muddy Waters from Live at the Checkerboard Lounge, Chicago 1981
"You Don't Have to Go", song by The War on Drugs from A Deeper Understanding
"You Don't Have to Go", song by Freddy Fender from Your Cheatin' Heart
"You Don't Have to Go", song by Pinetop Perkins from After Hours 
"You Don't Have to Go", song by The Misunderstood
"You Don't Have to Go", song by Eddie Cusic sampled on "Down the Road" by C2C
"You Don't Have to Go", first hit record of Jimmy Reed